Podolsky/Podolski (masculine), Podolskaya/Podolska (feminine), or Podolskoye/Podolscy (neuter) may refer to:

People

Podolski
Dariusz Podolski, Polish football player
Lukas Podolski (born 1985), Poland-born German football player
Łukasz Podolski (born 1980), Polish road cyclist
Sophie Podolski (1953–1974), Belgian poet and graphic artist
Waldemar Podolski, Polish football player
Deputy Commissioner Podolski, Brooklyn Nine-Nine character

Podolska
Iryna Podolska, Ukrainian football player

Podolsky
Boris Podolsky (1896–1966), American physicist
Leo Podolsky (1894–1987), Russian pianist

Podolskaya
Natalia Podolskaya (born 1982), Belarusian singer

Places
Podolsky District, a district of Moscow Oblast, Russia
Podolsky (rural locality) (Podolskaya, Podolskoye), several rural localities in Russia

See also
Podolia
Podolsk (disambiguation)
Podolski (surname)
Podolska Cavalry Brigade
Kamianets-Podilskyi, a city in Ukraine
Kamenets-Podolsky pocket, World War II battle